Francesca Marciano (born Rome, 17 July 1955) is an Italian writer and actress. She was the recipient of the Rapallo Carige Prize for Casa Rossa in 2003. She won a David di Donatello  award for  best screenplay with "Cursed the day I met you ", a film directed by Carlo Verdone in 1992.

Works in English 
 Rules of the wild, New York : Vintage Books, 1999. 
 Casa Rossa, Pantheon, New York, 2005.  
 The end of manners, New York : Vintage Contemporaries, 2009. 
 The other language : stories, New York : Vintage Books, 2015. 
 Animal Spirit: stories, New York : Alfred A Knopf, 2020.

Works 
 Casa Rossa : romanzo, Milano : TEA, Tascabili degli Editori Associati, 2003.
 La fine delle buone maniere : romanzo, Milano : Teadue, 2009.

References

Italian women novelists
20th-century Italian women writers
20th-century Italian novelists
20th-century Italian actresses
21st-century Italian novelists
21st-century Italian women writers
Italian women screenwriters
Italian screenwriters
Ciak d'oro winners
Writers from Rome
Actresses from Rome
1955 births
Living people